Senator Mayo may refer to:

Arthur Mayo (politician) (1936–2015), Maine State Senate
Lewis Mayo (politician) (1828–1907), Minnesota State Senate
Nathan Mayo (1876–1960), Florida State Senate
William Worrall Mayo (1819–1911), Minnesota State Senate